The World as It Goes is a 1781 comedy play by the British writer Hannah Cowley.

The original cast included William Thomas Lewis as Sir Charles Danvers, Charles Lee Lewes as Fairfax, John Quick as Grub, Richard Wilson as Colonel Sparwell, John Edwin as Bronze, Ralph Wewitzer as Von Irkin, Isabella Mattocks as Mrs Sparwell, Lydia Webb as Molly Grub, Elizabeth Inchbald as Sidney Grubb and Elizabeth Younge as Lady Danvers.

References

Bibliography
 Nicoll, Allardyce. A History of English Drama 1660–1900: Volume III. Cambridge University Press, 2009.
 Hogan, C.B (ed.) The London Stage, 1660–1800: Volume V. Southern Illinois University Press, 1968.
 Hannah Cowley, ‘’The World As It Goes’’, edited by William D. Brewer, Anthem Press, 2022.

1781 plays
Comedy plays
West End plays
Plays by Hannah Cowley